Yordan Terziev (born 20 July 1976) is a former Bulgarian footballer who played as a midfielder.

Career
A product of the Spartak Varna youth system, Terziev appeared in 13 A PFG matches for Levski Sofia between 2000 and 2002. He participated in 3 games for the "bluemen" in European tournaments, scoring a goal against Željezničar on 11 July 2001.  In the summer of 2002, Terziev was deemed surplus to the requirements by manager Slavoljub Muslin.

Honours

Club
Levski Sofia
 A Group: 2000–01

References

External links

1976 births
Living people
Bulgarian footballers
Association football midfielders
FC Botev Vratsa players
PFC Levski Sofia players
PFC Spartak Pleven players
PFC Spartak Varna players
PFC Cherno More Varna players
PFC Vidima-Rakovski Sevlievo players
PFC Ludogorets Razgrad players
First Professional Football League (Bulgaria) players
Sportspeople from Varna, Bulgaria